Soyland is a village in Calderdale, West Yorkshire, England. It is part of Ripponden civil parish. The village referred to as Soyland Town, used to be the site of several textile mills, but these have closed down. The walking route Calderdale Way passes through the area.

References

Villages in West Yorkshire
Ripponden